The Manusmṛiti, also known as the Mānava-Dharmaśāstra or Laws of Manu, is  one of the many legal texts and constitution among the many  of Hinduism. In ancient India, the sages often wrote their ideas on how society should run in the manuscripts. It is believed that the original form of Manusmriti was changed as many things written in the manuscript contradict each other.

Over fifty manuscripts of the Manusmriti are now known, but the earliest discovered, most translated and presumed authentic version since the 18th century has been the "Kolkata (formerly Calcutta) manuscript with Kulluka Bhatta commentary". Modern scholarship states this presumed authenticity is false, and the various manuscripts of Manusmriti discovered in India are inconsistent with each other, and within themselves, raising concerns of its authenticity, insertions and interpolations made into the text in later times.

The metrical text is in Sanskrit, is variously dated to be from the 2nd century BCE to 3rd century CE, and it presents itself as a discourse given by Manu (Svayambhuva) and Bhrigu on dharma topics such as duties, rights, laws, conduct, virtues and others. The text's influence had historically spread outside India. The medieval era Buddhistic law of Myanmar and Thailand are also ascribed to Manu, and the text influenced past Hindu kingdoms in Cambodia and Indonesia.

The Laws of Manu was one of the first Sanskrit texts to be translated into English in 1776, by British philologist Sir William Jones, and was used to construct the Hindu law code, for the East India Company administered enclaves.

Nomenclature
The title Manusmriti is a relatively modern term and a late innovation, probably coined because the text is in a verse form. The over-fifty manuscripts discovered of the text never use this title, but state the title as Manava Dharmasastra (Sanskrit: मानवधर्मशास्त्र) in their colophons at the end of each chapter. In modern scholarship, these two titles refer to the same text.

Chronology 
Eighteenth-century philologists Sir William Jones and Karl Wilhelm Friedrich Schlegel assigned Manusmriti to the period of around 1250 BCE and 1000 BCE respectively, which, from later linguistic developments, is untenable due to the language of the text which must be dated later than the late Vedic texts such as the Upanishads which are themselves dated a few centuries later, around 500 BCE. Later scholars shifted the chronology of the text to between 200 BCE and 200 CE. Olivelle adds that numismatic evidence and the mention of gold coins as a fine suggest the text may date to the 2nd or 3rd century CE.

Most scholars consider the text a composite produced by many authors put together over a long period. Olivelle states that the various ancient and medieval Indian texts claim revisions and editions were derived from the original text with 100,000 verses and 1,080 chapters. However, the text version in modern use, according to Olivelle, is likely the work of a single author or a chairman with research assistants.   

Manusmriti, Olivelle states, was not a new document - it drew on other texts, and reflects "a crystallization of an accumulated knowledge" in ancient India. The root of theoretical models within Manusmriti rely on at least two shastras that pre-date it: artha (statecraft and legal process) and dharma (an ancient Indian concept that includes duties, rights, laws, conduct, virtues and others discussed in various Dharmasutras, older than Manusmriti). Its contents can be traced to Kalpasutras of the Vedic era, which led to the development of Smartasutras consisting of Grihyasutras and Dharmasutras. The foundational texts of Manusmriti include many of these sutras, all from an era preceding the common era. Most of these ancient texts are now lost, and only four have survived: the law codes of Apastamba, Gautama, Baudhayana and Vasishtha.

Structure
The ancient version of the text has been subdivided into twelve Adhyayas (chapters), but the original text had no such division. The text covers different topics, and is unique among ancient Indian texts in using "transitional verses" to mark the end of one subject and the start of the next. The text can be broadly divided into four, each of different length. and each further divided into subsections:
Creation of the world
Source of dharma
The dharma of the four social classes
Law of karma, rebirth and final liberation

The text is composed in metric Shlokas (verses), in the form of a dialogue between an exalted teacher and disciples who are eager to learn about the various aspects of dharma. The first 58 verses are attributed by the text to Manu, while the remaining more than two thousand verses are attributed to his student Bhrigu. Olivelle lists the subsections as follows:

Sources of the law
The Dharmasya Yonih (Sources of the Law) has twenty-four verses and one transition verse. These verses state what the text considers as the proper and just sources of law:

This section of Manusmriti, like other Hindu law texts, includes fourfold sources of Dharma, states Levinson, which include Atmana santushti (satisfaction of one's conscience), Sadachara (local norms of virtuous individuals), Smriti and Sruti.

Dharma of the four Varnas

3.1 Rules Relating to Law (2.25 – 10.131)
3.1.1 Rules of Action in Normal Times (2.26 – 9.336)
3.1.1.1 Fourfold Dharma of a Brahmin (2.26 – 6.96) (contains the longest section of Manusmriti, 3.1, called dharmavidhi)
3.1.1.2 Rules of Action for a King (7.1 – 9.324) (contains 960 verses, includes description of institutions  and officials of state, how officials are to be appointed, tax laws, rules of war, the role and limits on the power of the king, and long sections on eighteen grounds for litigation, including those related to non-delivery under contract, breach of contract, non-payment of wages, property disputes, inheritance disputes, humiliation and defamation, physical assault, theft, violence of any form, injury, sexual crimes against women, public safety, and others; the section also includes rules of evidence, rules on interrogation of witnesses, and the organisation of court system)
3.1.1.3 Rules of Action for Vaiśyas and Śūdras (9.326 – 9.335) (shortest section, eight rules for Vaishyas, two for Shudras, but some applicable laws to these two classes are discussed generically in verses 2.26 – 9.324)
3.1.2 Rules of Action in Times of Adversity (10.1 – 11.129) (contains revised rules on the state machinery and four varnas in the times of war, famine or other emergencies)
3.2 Rules Relating to Penance (11.1 – 11.265) (includes rules of proportionate punishment; instead of fines, incarceration or death, discusses penance or social isolation as a form of punishment for certain crimes)

The verses 6.97, 9.325, 9.336 and 10.131 are transitional verses. Olivelle notes instances of likely interpolation and insertions in the notes to this section, in both the presumed vulgate version and the critical edition.

Determination of Karmayoga
The verses 12.1, 12.2 and 12.82 are transitional verses. This section is in a different style than the rest of the text, raising questions whether this entire chapter was added later. While there is evidence that this chapter was extensively redacted over time, however it is unclear whether the entire chapter is of a later era.
4.1 Fruits of Action (12.3–81) (section on actions and consequences, personal responsibility, action as a means of moksha – the highest personal bliss)
4.2 Rules of Action for Supreme Good (12.83–115) (section on karma, duties and responsibilities as a means of supreme good)

The closing verses of Manusmriti declares,

Contents
The structure and contents of the Manusmriti suggest it to be a document predominantly targeted at the Brahmins (priestly class) and the Kshatriyas (king, administration and warrior class). The text dedicates 1,034 verses, the largest portion, on laws for and expected virtues of Brahmins, and 971 verses for Kshatriyas. The statement of rules for the Vaishyas (merchant class) and the Shudras (artisans and working class) in the text is extraordinarily brief. Olivelle suggests that this may be because the text was composed to address the balance "between the political power and the priestly interests", and because of the rise in foreign invasions of India in the period it was composed.

On virtues and outcast
Manusmriti lists and recommends virtues in many verses. For example, verse 6.75 recommends non-violence towards everyone and temperance as key virtues, while verse 10.63 preaches that all four varnas must abstain from injuring any creature, abstain from falsehood and abstain from appropriating the property of others.

Similarly, in verse 4.204, states Olivelle, some manuscripts of Manusmriti list the recommended virtues to be, "compassion, forbearance, truthfulness, non-injury, self-control, not desiring, meditation, serenity, sweetness and honesty" as primary, and "purification, sacrifices, ascetic toil, gift giving, Vedic recitation, restraining the sexual organs, observances, fasts, silence and bathing" as secondary. A few manuscripts of the text contain a different verse 4.204, according to Olivelle, and list the recommended virtues to be, "not injuring anyone, speaking the truth, chastity, honesty and not stealing" as central and primary, while "not being angry, obedience to the teacher, purification, eating moderately and vigilance" to desirable and secondary.

In other discovered manuscripts of Manusmriti, including the most translated Calcutta manuscript, the text declares in verse 4.204 that the ethical precepts under Yamas such as Ahimsa (non-violence) are paramount while Niyamas such as Ishvarapranidhana (contemplation of personal god) are minor, and those who do not practice the Yamas but obey the Niyamas alone become outcasts.

Significance of Manusmriti

On personal choices, behaviours and morals
Manusmriti has various verses on duties a person has towards himself and to others, thus including moral codes as well as legal codes. Olivelle states that this is similar to the modern contrast between informal moral concerns to birth out of wedlock in the developed nations, along with simultaneous legal protection for children who are born out of wedlock.

Personal behaviours covered by the text are extensive. For example, verses 2.51–2.56 recommend that a monk must go on his begging round, collect alms food and present it to his teacher first, then eat. One should revere whatever food one gets and eat it without disdain, states Manusmriti, but never overeat, as eating too much harms health. In verse 5.47, the text states that work becomes without effort when a man contemplates, undertakes and does what he loves to do and when he does so without harming any creature.

Numerous verses relate to the practice of meat eating, how it causes injury to living beings, why it is evil, and the morality of vegetarianism. Yet, the text balances its moral tone as an appeal to one's conscience, states Olivelle. For example, verse 5.56 as translated by Olivelle states, "there is no fault in eating meat, in drinking liquor, or in having sex; that is the natural activity of creatures. Abstaining from such activity, however, brings greatest rewards."

On rights of women
Manusmriti offers an inconsistent and internally conflicting perspective on women's rights. The text, for example, declares that a marriage cannot be dissolved by a woman or a man, in verse 8.101–8.102. Yet, the text, in other sections, allows either to dissolve the marriage. For example, verses 9.72–9.81 allow the man or the woman to get out of a fraudulent marriage or an abusive marriage, and remarry; the text also provides legal means for a woman to remarry when her husband has been missing or has abandoned her.

It preaches chastity to widows such as in verses 5.158–5.160, and opposes a woman marrying someone outside her own social class as in verses 3.13–3.14. In other verses, such as 2.67–2.69 and 5.148–5.155, Manusmriti preaches that as a girl, she should obey and seek protection of her father, as a young woman her husband, and as a widow her son; and that a woman should always worship her husband as a god and a man should consider his wife an embodiment of goddess. In verses 3.55–3.56, Manusmriti also declares that "women must be honored and adorned", and "where women are revered, there the gods rejoice; but where they are not, no sacred rite bears any fruit". Elsewhere, in verses 5.147–5.148, states Olivelle, the text declares, "a woman must never seek to live independently".

Simultaneously, states Olivelle, the text enumerates numerous practices such as marriages outside one's varna (see anuloma and pratiloma), such as between a Brahmin man and a Shudra woman in verses 9.149–9.157, a widow becoming pregnant by a man she is not married to in verses 9.57–9.62, marriage where a woman elopes with her lover, and then grants legal rights in these cases such as property inheritance rights in verses 9.143–9.157, and the legal rights of the children so born. The text also provides for a situation when a married woman may become pregnant by a man other than her husband, and dedicates verses 8.31–8.56 to conclude that the child's custody belongs to the woman and her legal husband, and not to the biological father.

Manusmriti provides a woman with property rights to six types of property in verses 9.192–9.200. These include those she received at her marriage, or as gift when she eloped or when she was taken away, or as token of love before marriage, or as gifts from her biological family, or as received from her husband subsequent to marriage, and also from inheritance from deceased relatives.

Flavia Agnes states that Manusmriti is a complex commentary from women's rights perspective, and the British colonial era codification of women's rights based on it for Hindus, and from Islamic texts for Muslims, picked and emphasised certain aspects while it ignored other sections. This construction of personal law during the colonial era created a legal fiction around Manusmriti's historic role as a scripture in matters relating to women in South Asia.

On statecraft and rules of war
Chapter 7 of the Manusmriti discusses the duties of a king, what virtues he must have, what vices he must avoid. In verses 7.54–7.76, the text identifies precepts to be followed in selecting ministers, ambassadors and officials, as well as the characteristics of well fortified capital. Manusmriti then lays out the laws of just war, stating that first and foremost, war should be avoided by negotiations and reconciliations. If war becomes necessary, states Manusmriti, a soldier must never harm civilians, non-combatants or someone who has surrendered, that use of force should be proportionate, and other rules. Fair taxation guidelines are described in verses 7.127–7.137.

Authenticity and inconsistencies in various manuscripts
Patrick Olivelle, credited with a 2005 translation of Manusmriti published by the Oxford University Press, states the concerns in postmodern scholarship about the presumed authenticity and reliability of Manusmriti manuscripts. He writes (abridged),

Other scholars point to the inconsistencies and have questioned the authenticity of verses, and the extent to which verses were changed, inserted or interpolated into the original, at a later date. Sinha, for example, states that less than half, or only 1,214 of the 2,685 verses in Manusmriti, may be authentic. Further, the verses are internally inconsistent. Verses such as 3.55–3.62 of Manusmriti, for example, glorify the position of women, while verse such as 9.3 and 9.17 do the opposite. Other passages found in Manusmriti, such as those relating to Ganesha, are modern era insertions and forgeries. Robert E. Van Voorst states that the verses from 3.55–60 may be about respect given to a woman in her home, but within a strong patriarchal system.

Nelson in 1887, in a legal brief before the Madras High Court of British India, had stated, "there are various contradictions and inconsistencies in the Manu Smriti itself, and that these contradictions would lead one to conclude that such a commentary did not lay down legal principles to be followed but were merely recommendatory in nature." Mahatma Gandhi remarked on the observed inconsistencies within Manusmriti as follows:

Commentaries
There are numerous classical commentaries  on the  written in the medieval period.

Kane places him in the late 10th or early 11th century, Olivelle places him in the 8th century, and Derrett places him between 600 and 800 CE. From these three opinions we can place Bhāruci anywhere from the early 7th century CE to the early 11th century CE. Bhāruci's commentary, titled Manu-sastra-vivarana, has far fewer number of verses than the Kullūka-Calcutta vulgate version in circulation since the British colonial era, and it refers to more ancient texts that are believed to be lost. It is also called Raja-Vimala, and J. Duncan M. Derrett states Bharuci was "occasionally more faithful to his source's historical intention" than other commentators.

Medhātithi's commentary on  has been widely studied. Scholars such as Buhler, Kane, and Lingat believe he was from north India, likely the Kashmir region. His commentary on Manusmriti is estimated to be from 9th to 11th century.

Govindarāja's commentary, titled Manutika, is an 11th-century commentary on Manusmriti, referred to by Jimutavahana and Laksmidhara, and was plagiarised by Kullūka, states Olivelle.

Kullūka's commentary, titled Manvarthamuktavali, along with his version of the Manusmrti manuscript has been "vulgate" or default standard, most studied version, since it was discovered in 18th-century Calcutta by the British colonial officials. It is the most reproduced and famous, not because, according to Olivelle, it is the oldest or because of its excellence, but because it was the lucky version found first. The Kullūka commentary dated to be sometime between the 13th to 15th century, adds Olivelle, is mostly a plagiary of Govindaraja commentary from about the 11th century, but with Kullūka's criticism of Govindaraja.

Nārāyana's commentary, titled Manvarthavivrtti, is probably from the 14th century and little is known about the author. This commentary includes many variant readings, and Olivelle found it useful in preparing a critical edition of the Manusmriti text in 2005.

Nandana was from south India, and his commentary, titled Nandini, provides a useful benchmark on Manusmriti version and its interpretation in the south.

Other known medieval era commentaries on Manusmriti include those by Sarvajnanarayana, Raghavananda and Ramacandra.

Significance and role in history

In ancient and medieval India
Scholars doubt Manusmriti was ever administered as law text in ancient or medieval Hindu society. David Buxbaum states, "in the opinion of the best contemporary orientalists, it [Manusmriti] does not, as a whole, represent a set of rules ever actually administered in Hindustan. It is in great part an ideal picture of that which, in the view of a Brahmin, ought to be law".

Donald Davis writes, "there is no historical evidence for either an active propagation or implementation of Dharmasastra [Manusmriti] by a ruler or any state – as distinct from other forms of recognizing, respecting and using the text. Thinking of Dharmasastra as a legal code and of its authors as lawgivers is thus a serious misunderstanding of its history". Other scholars have expressed the same view, based on epigraphical, archaeological and textual evidence from medieval Hindu kingdoms in Gujarat, Kerala and Tamil Nadu, while acknowledging that Manusmriti was influential to the South Asian history of law and was a theoretical resource.

Outside India
The Dharma-sastras, particularly Manusmriti, states Anthony Reid, were "greatly honored in Burma's (Myanmar) – Wareru Dhammathat, Siam (Thailand), Cambodia and Java-Bali (Indonesia) as the defining documents of the natural order, which kings were obliged to uphold. They were copied, translated and incorporated into local law code, with strict adherence to the original text in Burma and Siam, and a stronger tendency to adapt to local needs in Java (Indonesia)". The medieval era derived texts and Manusmriti manuscripts in Southeast Asia are, however, quite different than the "vulgate" version that has been in use since its first use in British India. The role of then extant Manusmriti as a historic foundation of law texts for the people of Southeast Asia has been very important, states Hooker.

In British India

Prior to the British colonial rule, Sharia (Islamic law) for Muslims in South Asia had been codified as Fatawa-e-Alamgiri, but laws for non-Muslims – such as Hindus, Buddhists, Sikhs, Jains, Parsis – were not codified - both in regions of the subcontinent that witnessed anything upto 600 years of Islamic rule - as well as others. With the arrival of the British colonial officials, Manusmriti played a historic role in constructing a legal system for non-Muslims in South Asia and early Western perceptions about the ancient and medieval Indian society.

In the 18th century, the earliest British of the East India Company acted as agents of the Mughal emperor. As the British colonial rule took over the political and administrative powers in India, it was faced with various state responsibilities such as legislative and judiciary functions. The East India Company, and later the British Crown, sought profits for its British shareholders through trade as well as sought to maintain effective political control with minimal military engagement. The administration pursued a path of least resistance, relying upon co-opted local intermediaries that were mostly Muslims and some Hindus in various princely states. The British exercised power by avoiding interference and adapting to law practices as explained by the local intermediaries. The existing legal texts for Muslims, and resurrected Manusmriti manuscript thus helped the colonial state sustain the pre-colonial religious and political law and conflicts, well into the late nineteenth century. The colonial policy on the system of personal laws for India, for example, was expressed by Governor-General Hastings in 1772 as follows,

For Muslims of India, the British accepted sharia as the legal code for Muslims, based on texts such the al-Sirjjiyah and Fatawa-i Alamgiri written under sponsorship. of Aurangzeb. For Hindus and other non-Muslims such as Buddhists, Sikhs, Jains, Parsis and Tribal people, this information was unavailable. The substance of Hindu law, was derived by the British colonial officials from Manusmriti, and it became the first Dharmasastra that was translated in 1794. The British colonial officials, for practice, attempted to extract from the Dharmaśāstra, the English categories of law and religion for the purposes of colonial administration.

The British colonial officials, however, mistook the Manusmriti as codes of law, failing to recognise that it was a commentary on morals and law and not a statement of positive law. The colonial officials of the early 19th century also failed to recognise that Manusmriti was one of many competing Dharmasastra texts, it was not in use for centuries during the Islamic rule period of India. The officials resurrected Manusmriti, constructed statements of positive law from the text for non-Muslims, in order to remain faithful to its policy of using sharia for the South Asian Muslim population. Manusmriti thus played a role in constructing the Anglo-Hindu law, as well as Western perceptions about ancient and medieval era Hindu culture from the colonial times. Abdullahi Ahmed An-Na'im states the significance and role of Manusmriti in governing India during the colonial era as follows (abridged),

Comparison with other dharmasastras

Along with Manusmriti (Manava Dharmasastra), ancient India had between eighteen and thirty six competing Dharma-sastras, states John Bowker. Many of these texts have been lost completely or in parts, but they are referred to in other ancient Indian texts suggesting that they were influential in some regions or time. Of the numerous jurisprudence-related commentaries and Smriti texts, after Manu Smriti and other than the older Dharma Sutras, Yajnavalkya Smriti has attracted the attention of many scholars, followed by Narada Smriti and Parashara Smriti (the oldest Dharma-smriti). According to Ghose and other scholars, evidence suggests that Yajnavalkya Smriti was the more referred to text than Manu Smriti in matters of governance and practice. This text, of unclear date of composition but likely to be a few centuries after Manusmriti, is more "concise, methodical, distilled and liberal". According to Jois,

Jois suggests that the Yajnavalkya Smriti text liberal evolution may have been influenced by Buddhism in ancient India. The Yajnavalkya text is also different from Manu text in adding chapters to the  organisation of monasteries, land grants, deeds execution and other matters. The Yajnavalkya text was more referred to by many Hindu kingdoms of the medieval era, as evidenced by the commentary of 12th-century Vijñāneśvara, titled Mitakshara.

Modern reception

The Manusmrti has been subject to appraisal and criticism. Among the notable Indian critics of the text in the early 20th century was B. R. Ambedkar, who held Manusmriti as responsible for caste system in India. In protest, Ambedkar burnt Manusmrti in a bonfire on 25 December 1927. While Ambedkar condemned Manusmriti, Mahatma Gandhi opposed the book burning. The latter stated that while caste discrimination was harmful to spiritual and national growth, it had nothing to do with Hinduism and its texts such as Manusmriti. Gandhi argued that the text recognises different callings and professions, defines not one's rights but one's duties, that all work from that of a teacher to a janitor are equally necessary, and of equal status. Gandhi considered Manusmriti to include lofty teachings but a text with inconsistency and contradictions, whose original text is in no one's possession. He recommended that one must read the entire text, accept those parts of Manusmriti which are consistent with "truth and ahimsa  (non-injury or non-violence to others)" and the rejection of other parts.

The Manu Smriti was one of the first Sanskrit texts studied by the European philologists. It was first translated into English by Sir William Jones. His version was published in 1794. This interest in its translation was encouraged by British administrative requirements, which they believed to be legal codes. In fact, states Romila Thapar, these were not codes of law but social and ritual texts.

A Louis Jacolliot translation of the Calcutta version of "Law of Manu" was reviewed by Friedrich Nietzsche. He commented on it both favourably and unfavorably:
He deemed it "an incomparably spiritual and superior work" to the Christian Bible, observed that "the sun shines on the whole book" and attributed its ethical perspective to "the noble classes, the philosophers and warriors, [who] stand above the mass". Nietzsche does not advocate a caste system, states David Conway, but endorses the political exclusion conveyed in the Manu text. Nietzsche considered Manu's social order as far from perfect, but considers the general idea of a caste system to be natural and right, and stated that "caste-order, order of rank is just a formula for the supreme law of life itself", a "natural order, lawfulness par excellence". According to Nietzsche, states Julian Young, "Nature, not Manu, separates from each other: predominantly spiritual people, people characterized by muscular and temperamental strength, and a third group of people who are not distinguished in either way, the average". He wrote that "To prepare a book of law in the style of Manu means to give a people the right to become master one day, to become perfect, – to aspire to the highest art of life."
The Law of Manu was also criticised by Nietzsche. He, states Walter Kaufmann, "denounces the way in which the 'Law of Manu' dealt with the outcastes, saying that there is nothing that outrages our feelings more ..." Nietzsche wrote, "these regulations teach us enough, in them we find for once Aryan humanity, quite pure, quite primordial, we learn that the concept of pure blood is the opposite of a harmless concept."

B. R. Ambedkar asserted that Manu Smriti was written by a sage named Brigu during the times of Pushyamitra of Shunga in connection with social pressures caused by the rise of Buddhism. However, historian Romila Thapar considers these claims to be exaggerations. Thapar writes that archaeological evidence casts doubt on the claims of Buddhist persecution by Pushyamitra. Support of the Buddhist faith by the Shungas at some point is suggested by an epigraph on the gateway of Bharhut, which mentions its erection "during the supremacy of the Shungas".

Pollard et al. state that the code of Manu was derived to answer questions on how men could rebuild their societies following a series of floods. Swami Dayananda Saraswati, the founder of Arya Samaj, held the text to be authentic and authoritative. Other admirers of the text have included Annie Besant.

Friedrich Nietzsche is noted to have said "Close the Bible and open the Manu Smriti. It has an affirmation of life, a triumphing agreeable sensation in life and that to draw up a lawbook such as Manu means to permit oneself to get the upper hand, to become perfection, to be ambitious of the highest art of living."

Editions and translations

Ganganath Jha, Manusmriti with the Commentary of Medhatithi, 1920, 
J. I. Shastri (ed.), Manusmriti with Kullukabhatta Commentary (1972–1974), reprinted by Motilal Banarsidass, .

Pranjivan Harihar Pandya (ed.), Manusmriti; With a commentary called Manvarth Muktavali by Kullooka Bhatt, Bombay, 1913. 
Ramacandra Varma Shastri, Manusmr̥ti: Bhāratīya ācāra-saṃhitā kā viśvakośa, Śāśvata Sāhitya Prakāśana, 1997. 
The Institutes of Hindu Law: Or, The Ordinances of Manu, Calcutta: Sewell & Debrett, 1796.

See also
 Apastamba Dharmasutra
 Arthashastra
 Classical Hindu law
 Classical Hindu law in practice
 Dharmaśāstra
 Gentoo Code
 Hindu law
 Kalpa (Vedanga)
 Kalpa S%C5%ABtra
 Vajrasuchi Upanishad
 Yājñavalkya Smṛti

Notes

References

External links
 12th chapters of manusmriti

Hindu law
Ancient Indian law
Dharmaśāstra